Capaware is a 3D general purpose virtual worlds viewer. It is a free software project which began in 2007, released for the purpose of promoting the development of free software in the Canary Islands by its Government. Capaware allows interaction with 3D virtual terrain mapping, and is distributed under license GPL. It provides access to information that fits the specifications of the OGC. 

It was developed in  C++ programming language. At present it works under Microsoft Windows and Linux. Capaware uses OpenSceneGraph as graphics engine, achieving extremely high frames per second rates. Capaware's architecture has a plugin interface allowing new plugins.

Plugins

At present there is only a half-developed plugin as an example of the potential of Capaware: 

 'Simulation of Forest Fires'. Adds functionality to simulate the progress of a forest fire. (Currently in development).

External links 
 

Free GIS software
Free software programmed in C++
Geographic information systems
Software that uses wxWidgets